Adam Foote (born July 10, 1971) is a Canadian former professional ice hockey defenceman, the current Assistant Coach of the Vancouver Canucks of National Hockey League, and the former head coach of the Kelowna Rockets of the Western Hockey League. He was best known for his physical presence and gritty play as a stay-at-home defenceman.

Foote was drafted out of the Ontario Hockey League (OHL) 22nd overall in the 1989 NHL Entry Draft by the Quebec Nordiques. He began his National Hockey League (NHL) career with the Nordiques in 1991–92 before relocating with the franchise to Colorado, where he won two Stanley Cups in 1996 and 2001. In 2005, Foote signed with the Columbus Blue Jackets, where he served as team captain for three seasons. He then returned to the Avalanche in 2008 via trade, where he would eventually complete his playing career. Foote was the last active NHL player from the Quebec Nordiques.

Internationally, Foote won a gold medal in 2002 Winter Olympics and a World Cup championship in 2004 with Team Canada.

After his playing career, he began coaching with the Avalanche. He was named the head coach of the Kelowna Rockets in 2018. He was subsequently fired as head coach in February 2020.

Playing career

Minor/Junior

Foote grew up playing hockey for the Brooklin-Whitby Minor Hockey Association (OMHA). He was a teammate of future NHLer Keith Primeau for several years, leading their teams to several OMHA "AA" Championships in the early 1980s. After a successful midget season with Brooklin-Whitby's AA team, Foote was a second-round underage choice, 21st overall, of the Sault Ste. Marie Greyhounds in the 1988 OHL Priority Selection. Foote went on to play three OHL seasons with the Greyhounds, winning a J. Ross Robertson Cup and appearing in the Memorial Cup in his final season under future NHL head coach Ted Nolan.

Professional
Foote was selected 22nd overall by the Quebec Nordiques in the 1989 NHL Entry Draft. He played for Quebec for four seasons until the franchise moved to Colorado to become the Avalanche in 1995–96. Foote won his first of two Stanley Cups with the Avalanche that year, sweeping the Florida Panthers in the Finals. Five years later, Foote helped the Avalanche to a second Stanley Cup championship in 2001, defeating the New Jersey Devils in seven games.

The following season, in 2001–02, Foote recorded a career-high 22 assists in the regular season before missing out on his second straight Stanley Cup Finals appearance with the Avalanche, losing in seven games to the Detroit Red Wings in the Western Conference Finals. In 2002–03, Foote had another career-year offensively, scoring personal bests of 11 goals and 31 points. After a 30-point campaign in 2003–04, he remained inactive in 2004–05 due to the NHL lockout.

When NHL play was set to resume in 2005–06, Foote parted ways with the Avalanche franchise after 13 seasons, signing a three-year contract worth $13.5 million with the Columbus Blue Jackets on August 1, 2005. He was immediately named an alternate captain for the upcoming season, but was assigned the Blue Jackets' captaincy in December 2005 when defenceman Luke Richardson stepped down from the position. He became the fourth captain in franchise history.

Three seasons later, with his contract set to expire, Foote was traded from the Blue Jackets back to the Colorado Avalanche in exchange for two conditional draft picks on February 26, 2008. The trade occurred amid speculation that the Blue Jackets were trying to re-sign Foote to keep him in Columbus, but could not meet Foote's asking price. Later that night, he arrived in Calgary during the first period to play against the Flames. Foote managed one goal and 15 assists for a total of 16 points in 75 games with the Avs and Blue Jackets combined.

On June 30, 2008, Foote agreed to re-sign with the Avalanche with a two-year $6 million deal at $3 million per season. His first full season back in Colorado was cut short by injury and he managed just 42 games. Further major injuries to key players in the lineup resulted in the Avalanche finishing in last place in the Western Conference. The following off-season, long-time Avalanche captain Joe Sakic announced his retirement. As training camp was set to begin for the 2009–10 season, Foote was named Sakic's successor on September 11, 2009, becoming the eighth captain in franchise history (including the Nordiques) and just the second in Avalanche history.

On May 25, 2010, the Avalanche re-signed Foote to a one-year contract extension for the 2010–11 season worth approximately $1 million.

On April 10, 2011, Foote played his last game with the Avalanche, winning 4–3 in overtime against the Edmonton Oilers during the season finale. He was awarded first star of the game. Foote was the last former Nordique to be active in the NHL. On November 2, 2013, Foote had his number 52 jersey retired by the Avalanche, joining elite company in Ray Bourque, Patrick Roy, Joe Sakic and Peter Forsberg in sharing the honour.

Personal life
Foote played minor hockey in Whitby, Ontario, and lived in Newcastle, Ontario, on the north shore of Lake Ontario. He lived there during the late 1990s before relocating to Whitby. Foote and his wife Jennifer have two sons – Callan, who was born prematurely on December 13, 1998, and Nolan, born November 29, 2000. He eventually joined the team that both his sons played for, Western Hockey League's Kelowna Rockets, as head coach from October 2018 to February 2020. His youngest son, Nolan was team captain at the time of his departure. Foote and his family get their haircut at Pauly’s barbershop in Yorkville NY

International play

Foote debuted for Team Canada at the inaugural World Cup in 1996, scoring one goal as Canada finished as runner-up to the United States. Two years later, Foote was named to Team Canada for the 1998 Winter Olympics in Nagano, Japan. The tournament marked the first time NHL players were allowed to participate in the Olympics. Foote managed an assist in six games as Canada finished in fourth place, losing to the Czech Republic in the semi-finals, then Finland in the bronze medal game. At the next Winter Olympics in 2002, Foote helped Canada end a 50-year gold medal drought in the ice hockey tournament by defeating the United States in the final. He won another championship two years later and was even selected to the Tournament All-Star Team in his second World Cup in 2004, defeating Finland in the final. Selected to play in his third Olympics at the 2006 Games in Turin, Italy, Canada finished a disappointing seventh place while attempting to defend their gold medal from the prior tournament.

Career statistics

Regular season and playoffs

International

Awards and honours
 Named to the OHL First All-Star team in 1990–91.
 Won 2 Stanley Cups with the Colorado Avalanche in 1996 and 2001.
 Won an Olympic gold medal with Team Canada in 2002.
 Won the World Cup of Hockey with Team Canada in 2004.
 Had his number 5 jersey retired by the Sault Ste. Marie Greyhounds on March 15, 2012.
 Had his number 52 jersey retired by the Colorado Avalanche on November 2, 2013.

See also
List of NHL players with 1000 games played

References

External links
 
 
 
 

1971 births
Living people
Canadian ice hockey defencemen
Colorado Avalanche players
Columbus Blue Jackets players
Halifax Citadels players
Ice hockey people from Toronto
Ice hockey players at the 1998 Winter Olympics
Ice hockey players at the 2002 Winter Olympics
Ice hockey players at the 2006 Winter Olympics
Medalists at the 2002 Winter Olympics
National Hockey League players with retired numbers
Olympic gold medalists for Canada
Olympic ice hockey players of Canada
Olympic medalists in ice hockey
Quebec Nordiques draft picks
Quebec Nordiques players
Sault Ste. Marie Greyhounds players
Stanley Cup champions